Thomas C. Cheney (October 10, 1868 – October 13, 1957) was a Vermont politician and attorney who served as Speaker of the Vermont House of Representatives.

Biography
Thomas Charles Cheney was born in Morristown, Vermont, on October 10, 1868.  He graduated from the University of Vermont in 1891, studied law and became an attorney in Morrisville, Vermont. Cheney served in several local offices including school board member, and was Morristown's Town Meeting Moderator for more than 25 years.

Cheney also became active in the insurance business, and was president of the Vermont Insurance Federation and a director of the Vermont Mutual Fire Insurance Company.

A Republican, in 1892 Cheney worked in the office of the Vermont Secretary of State. He was an assistant clerk of the Vermont House of Representatives from 1894 to 1898, and clerk from 1898 to 1906.

From 1900 to 1902, Cheney was Lamoille County State's Attorney.

In 1906 and 1908, Cheney was elected as a member of the Vermont House, serving from 1906 to 1910. He was Speaker for the entire length of his house service.

After leaving office, Cheney returned to his legal and insurance interests. He died in Morrisville on October 13, 1957, and was buried in the Pleasant View Cemetery there.

References

External links

1868 births
1957 deaths
People from Morristown, Vermont
University of Vermont alumni
Vermont lawyers
State's attorneys in Vermont
Speakers of the Vermont House of Representatives
Republican Party members of the Vermont House of Representatives
Burials in Vermont